KURM-FM 100.3 FM is a radio station licensed to Gravette, Arkansas.  The station broadcasts a News Talk Information format and is owned by KERM, Inc.

References

External links
KURM's website

URM
News and talk radio stations in the United States
Radio stations established in 1989
1989 establishments in Arkansas
Gravette, Arkansas